Lixian Town is a town in the southeastern side of Daxing District, Beijing, China. It shares border with Weishanzhuang and Anding Towns in the north, Wanzhuang and Jiuzhou Towns in the east, Yufa Town in the southwest, and Panggezhuang Town in the northwest. In 2020, it had a total population of 40,930.

The name of this town corresponds to Lixianguan, which was built in the area by King Zhao of Yan during Spring and Autumn period.

History

Administrative divisions 
In the year 2021, Lixian Town administered 44 subdivisions within its borders, with 2 communities, and 42 villages:

See also 

 List of township-level divisions of Beijing

References 

Towns in Beijing
Daxing District